Modumudi is a village in the Krishna district of Indian state of Andhra Pradesh. It is located in Avanigadda mandal of Machilipatnam revenue division.

Demographics

 Census of India, Modumudi had a population of 4256 with 2490 households. The total population constitute, 2127 males and 2129 females with a sex ratio of 1001 females per 1000 males. 340 children are in the age group of 0–6 years, with a sex ratio of 969 per 1000. Child population constitute 7.99% of the total population. The average literacy rate stands at 73.32%, significantly higher than the state average of 67.41%.

References 

Villages in Krishna district